
This is a list of players who graduated from the Challenge Tour in 2012. The top 21 players on the Challenge Tour's money list in 2012 earned their European Tour card for 2013.

* European Tour rookie in 2013
T = Tied 
 The player retained his European Tour card for 2014 (finished inside the top 110).
 The player did not retain his European Tour card for 2014, but retained conditional status (finished between 111 and 145).
 The player did not retain his European Tour card for 2014 (finished outside the top 145).

Broberg earned a direct promotion to the European Tour after his third win of 2012 in August. Because Carlsson had also finished 93rd in the Race to Dubai, the graduating places were extended by one. The players ranked 17th through 21st were placed below the Qualifying School graduates on the exemption list, and thus could improve their status by competing in Qualifying School. Morten Ørum Madsen improved his status in this way. Hartø, Wakefield, Stal, and Brooks regained their cards for 2014 through Q School.

Runners-up on the European Tour in 2013

See also
2012 European Tour Qualifying School graduates

External links 
Final ranking for 2012

Challenge Tour
European Tour
Challenge Tour Graduates
Challenge Tour Graduates